U.S. Route 36 (US 36) in the state of Ohio runs from the Indiana state line near Palestine to the highway's eastern terminus at US 250 and State Route 800 (SR 800) in Uhrichsville. US 36 intersects several major highways in the state, including Interstate 75 (I-75), I-71, and I-77.

Route description

Indiana state line to Delaware
Starting at the state line, US 36 travels east on a somewhat straight line, entering the village of Palestine. South of Greenville, US 36 intersects SR 121 before meeting US 127. US 36 then travels north concurrently with US 127, meeting SR 49 and bypassing downtown Greenville. US 36 leaves US 127 at an interchange with SR 571. Westbound US 36 traffic on that interchange briefly runs concurrently with the state route.

Between Greenville and Covington, US 36 parallels the Greenville Creek. Along its course, the route serves Gettysburg and Bradford (via SR 721). After crossing the Stillwater River in Covington, US 36 intersects with SR 41/SR 48. US 36 then travels due northeast straight to Piqua. The route intersects with SR 185 west of downtown Piqua, SR 66 in the downtown area, and I-75 east of the Great Miami River. US 36 then travels on a somewhat straight route toward Urbana, serving SR 589 between Fletcher and west of Conover, Lena, SR 235, St. Paris, SR 560 in Westville, SR 29 between west and east of downtown Urbana, US 68 in downtown, and SR 54 east of downtown. East of Urbana, US 36 begins to wind a little bit. The route then meets SR 814 and SR 559.

Between Irwin and Marysville, US 36 runs concurrently with SR 4. The only town in between the two municipalities is Milford Center. West of Marysville, both routes merge onto US 33 at a trumpet/parclo hybrid. North of the city, after meeting SR 31, SR 4 leaves the expressway bypass. At the next exit, US 36 also leaves the expressway. On its way to Delaware, US 36 meets New Dover, Ostrader, and SR 257. Between the Ohio Wesleyan University and the Olentangy River in Delaware, US 36 meets US 23/US 42, beginning a short concurrency with US 42. After crossing the river, US 42 turns north from US 36.

Delaware to Uhrichsville
After leaving the downtown area of Delaware, SR 37 begins running along US 36 all the way to Sunbury. Shortly after that intersection, both routes intersect with SR 521 at a shopping mall. As the road approaches Berkshire, both routes meet I-71. In Sunbury, US 36 leaves SR 37 to travel from southeast to northeast along SR 3. After this intersection, both US 36 and SR 3 meet SR 67. On their way northeast to Mt. Vernon, both routes meet Centerburg, SR 657, Mt. Liberty, Bangs, and SR 229 (beginning of its concurrency). After the latter intersection, the road curves eastward toward downtown Mt. Vernon. Southbound SR 13 travels two blocks east along the concurrency from Sandusky to Mulberry streets. Eastbound SR 229 also leaves at Mulberry Street. Shortly after the intersection, US 36, SR 3, and westbound SR 229 travel through a traffic circle.

For the remainder of its course through Mt. Vernon, US 36 travels from High Street to Coshocton Avenue via Park Street. In the outskirts, US 36 meets SR 768. On its way to Coshocton, US 36 somewhat meanders eastward due to the Kokosing and the Walhonding rivers. Along its way, the route meets SR 308, Howard, US 62 via streets in Millwood, SR 715, SR 229 (again) and SR 206 near Newcastle, SR 79 and SR 715 (again) in Nellie, and SR 36 in Warsaw. At the intersection of SR 16/SR 83 around Coshocton, US 36 travels northeast along the road (SR 16 also ends there). At the next intersection across the river, SR 83 branches off north. At this point, the remainder of US 36 parallels the Tuscarawas River.

US 36 went on to meander east and meet SR 621 in Canal Lewisville, SR 93 north of West Lafayette, SR 751, SR 258 in Newcomerstown, and I-77. In Newcomerstown, US 36 begins heading northeast to Uhrichsville. For its remainder of the route, US 36 meets Port Washington, SR 416 in Gnadenhutten, Riverside Park, and Tuscarawas. As US 36 became an expressway bypass in Uhrichsville, US 36 ends at a parclo interchange with US 250/SR 800. Thru traffic on the expressway would continue as US 250 and SR 800.

Major intersections

References

 Ohio